Jimmy Adolfo Asprilla Mosquera (born June 1, 1980) is a Colombian footballer who plays as a defender. He was born in the city of Zarzal in the Valle Department of Colombia.

External links
  
 
 
 

1980 births
Living people
Colombian footballers
Association football defenders
Colombia international footballers
Atlético Huila footballers
Once Caldas footballers
Deportivo Cali footballers
Sport Boys footballers
Estudiantes de Mérida players
Atlético Bucaramanga footballers
Millonarios F.C. players
Deportivo Pasto footballers
América de Cali footballers
Cúcuta Deportivo footballers
Categoría Primera A players
Colombian expatriate footballers
Expatriate footballers in Peru
Expatriate footballers in Venezuela
Sportspeople from Valle del Cauca Department